Nicola M. Kayes is a New Zealand health psychologist, director of the Centre for Person Centred Research and professor of rehabilitation at Auckland University of Technology (AUT).

Academic career 
Kayes graduated from the University of Auckland with a BSc in 1997 and MSc in 1999 for her thesis titled "The Role that Illness Perceptions Play in the Adjustment to Multiple Sclerosis". She completed a PhD at AUT titled "Physical activity engagement in people with Multiple Sclerosis" in March 2011.

In November 2019 Kayes was promoted to full professor at AUT. As of 2021 she is immediate past president of the New Zealand Rehabilitation Association and a principal investigator with Brain Research New Zealand.

Selected publications

References

External links 

 
Grey Matters website
 

Living people
Year of birth missing (living people)
New Zealand women academics
New Zealand psychologists
University of Auckland alumni
Auckland University of Technology alumni
Academic staff of the Auckland University of Technology
Academics of the University of Brighton